Aristotle's axiom is an axiom in the foundations of geometry, proposed by Aristotle in On the Heavens that states: 

If   is an acute angle and AB is any segment, then there exists a point P on the ray   and a point Q on the ray , such that PQ is perpendicular to OX and PQ > AB. 

Aristotle's axiom  is a consequence of the Archimedean property, and the conjunction of Aristotle's axiom and the Lotschnittaxiom, which states that "Perpendiculars raised on each side of a right angle intersect", is equivalent to the Parallel Postulate.

Without the parallel postulate, Aristotle's axiom is equivalent to each of the following three incidence-geometric statements: 
Given a line a and a point P on a, as well as two intersecting lines m and n, both parallel to a, there exists a line g  through P which intersects m but not n.
Given a line a as well as two intersecting lines m and n, both parallel to a, there exists a line g which intersects a and m, but not n.
Given a line a and two distinct intersecting lines m and n, each different from a, there exists a line g which intersects a and m, but not n.

References

Sources

Foundations of geometry
Aristotelianism